Ranchi Assembly constituency   is an assembly constituency in the Indian state of Jharkhand.

Members of Assembly

Election results

2019

2014

See also
Vidhan Sabha
List of states of India by type of legislature

References
Schedule – XIII of Constituencies Order, 2008 of Delimitation of Parliamentary and Assembly constituencies Order, 2008 of the Election Commission of India 

Assembly constituencies of Jharkhand
Ranchi